Furnes is a former municipality in the old Hedmark county, Norway. The  municipality existed from 1891 until its dissolution in 1964 when it became part of Ringsaker Municipality. The administrative centre of the municipality was the village of Furnes where the Furnes Church is located.

History
The municipality of Furnes was established in 1891 when the old municipality of Vang was divided into two: Furnes in the west (population: 3,790) and Vang in the east (population: 5,703). In 1947, a part of Furnes (population: 821) near the town of Hamar was transferred from Furnes to the neighboring Hamar Municipality. During the 1960s, there were many municipal mergers across Norway due to the work of the Schei Committee. On 1 January 1964, the municipality of Furnes (population: 7,288) was merged with the municipality of Nes (population: 4,184), the municipality of Ringsaker (population: 16,490), and the Hamarsberget and Vikersødegården areas of the municipality of Vang (population: 34) to create the new, larger Ringsaker Municipality.

Name
The municipality was named after the village of Furnes since that was the site of the Furnes Church. The meaning of the first element is unknown. It is possible that the first part came from the old name of a local river such as Fura or it could be derived from the word furu which means "pine". The last element is nes which means "headland".

Government
All municipalities in Norway, including Furnes, are responsible for primary education (through 10th grade), outpatient health services, senior citizen services, unemployment and other social services, zoning, economic development, and municipal roads. The municipality was governed by a municipal council of elected representatives, which in turn elected a mayor.

Municipal council
The municipal council  of Furnes was made up of 23 representatives that were elected to four year terms.  The party breakdown of the final municipal council was as follows:

See also
List of former municipalities of Norway

References

Ringsaker
Furnes, Norway
Former municipalities of Norway
1891 establishments in Norway
1964 disestablishments in Norway